William Digby  (21 January 1733 – 18 September 1788) was an eighteenth century Anglican priest.

He was the son of Hon. Edward Digby (son of William Digby, 5th Baron Digby) and Charlotte Fox, daughter of Sir Stephen Fox. He was the younger brother of Henry Digby, 1st Earl Digby and first cousin of Charles James Fox. Digby was Vicar of Coleshill and then successively Dean of Worcester and Durham. He was also an Honorary Chaplain to the King.

References

1733 births
1788 deaths
Honorary Chaplains to the King
Deans of Worcester
Deans of Durham
18th-century English Anglican priests
William